Nicrophorus apo is a species of burying beetle found in Mindanao in the Philippines. The species was first described scientifically by Ross H. Arnett, Jr. in 1950, and is named after Mount Apo.

References

Silphidae
Insects of the Philippines
Beetles described in 1950
Fauna of Mindanao